The 1913 Maine Black Bears football team was an American football team that represented the University of Maine during the 1913 college football season. The team compiled a 5–2–1 record. Thomas J. Riley was the coach, and Allan Sawyer was the team captain.

Schedule

References

Maine
Maine Black Bears football seasons
Maine Black Bears football